The 2018 season is Bethlehem Steel FC's third season of competitive soccer in the United Soccer League and second season competing in the second division of American soccer. Steel FC compete in the league's Eastern Conference.

Current roster

Transfers

In

Out

Loan in

Competitions

Preseason

USL regular season
The 2018 USL season will be contested by 33 teams, 16 of which compete in the league's Eastern Conference. All teams will play a regular season total of 34 matches between teams within their respective conference. At the conclusion of the regular season, the top eight teams from each conference advance to the 2018 USL Playoffs for a chance to compete for the USL Championship Title.

Standings (Eastern Conference)

Results
All times in Eastern Time.

Results summary

USL Playoffs

Statistics

|-
|colspan="10"|Defenders:
|-

|-
|colspan="10"|Midfielders:
|-

|-
|colspan="10"|Forwards:
|-

|}
Players with names in italics were on loan from Philadelphia Union for individual matches with Bethlehem.
Players with names marked ‡ were academy call-ups from Philadelphia Union Academy for individual matches with Bethlehem.
Players with names marked * were on loan from another club for the whole of their season with Bethlehem.

Goalkeepers
As of February 9, 2019.

Honors

Team of the Week
 Week 1 Team of the Week: F Brandon Allen
 Week 5 Team of the Week Bench: M Derrick Jones
 Week 8 Team of the Week: M Santi Moar
 Week 10 Team of the Week: M Fabian Herbers, Bench M Adam Najem
 Week 12 Team of the Week: M Santi Moar
 Week 13 Team of the Week: D Matthew Real
 Week 14 Team of the Week: M Derrick Jones
 Week 15 Team of the Week: M Chris Nanco
 Week 16 Team of the Week: M Drew Skundrich
 Week 17 Team of the Week Bench: M Fabian Herbers
 Week 20 Team of the Week: M Brenden Aaronson
 Week 21 Team of the Week: D Olivier Mbaizo
 Week 22 Team of the Week: G Jake McGuire
 Week 24 Team of the Week: D Matthew Mahoney, M Santi Moar

USL Coach of the Month
August: Brendan Burke

References

Bethlehem Steel FC
Bethlehem Steel FC
Philadelphia Union II seasons
Bethlehem Steel FC